A polygraph (from Ancient Greek: πολύς, poly = "many" and γράφειν, graphein = "to write") is an author who writes in a variety of fields.

In literature, the term polygraph is often applied to certain writers of antiquity such as Aristotle, Plutarch, Varro, Cicero and Pliny the Elder. Polygraphs still existed in the Middle Ages and Renaissance, but, other than writers of books for children, they have become rarer in modern times due to the specialisation of knowledge. Voltaire and Diderot are examples of modern polygraphs.

Polygraph writers

Classical Antiquity
 Xenophon
 Philostratus of Lemnos
 Duris of Samos 
 Suetonius
 Apuleius
 Apion

Middle Ages
 Abu Nuwas
 Isidore of Seville
 Jacob of Edessa
 Al-Jahiz
 Michael Psellos 
 Bar-Hebraeus
 Piero Valeriano Bolzani

Early modern period (1500-1800)

 Carlo Amoretti
 Jean-François de Bastide
 Giuseppe Betussi
 Jacques Pierre Brissot
 Gatien de Courtilz de Sandras
 Johann Wolfgang von Goethe
 Ferdinand Hoefer
 Athanasius Kircher
 Pierre-Jean Le Corvaisier
 Pierre Louis Manuel
 Mathieu-François Pidansat de Mairobert
 Nicolas Edme Restif de La Bretonne
 César Vichard de Saint-Réal
 Francesco Sansovino
 Charles Sorel

Modern era (1800 onwards)
 August Strindberg
 Jean-Marie-Vincent Audin
 Arthur Conan Doyle
 Pierre Gévart
 Henry de Graffigny
 T. Proctor Hall
 Léon Halévy
 Vincent Labaume
 Paul Lacroix
 Gustave Le Rouge
 Simin Palay
 Christian Plume 
 Claude Roy
 Ludwig Tieck
 Isaac Asimov
 Stephen Jay Gould

Other usage
The term can be used in a pejorative sense to mean a journalist who writes on many subjects but without expertise in any particular one.  The composer Georg Telemann was considered, somewhat pejoratively, a polygraph by critics due to the vast number and variety of his musical compositions.

Notes

This article incorporates text from French Wikipedia, Polygraphe (auteur).

Writing occupations
Writing